Nepenthes × pangulubauensis (from Mount Pangulubau) is a natural hybrid between N. mikei and N. gymnamphora (or N. xiphioides, depending on whether it is considered a distinct species). It is endemic to the Indonesian island of Sumatra.

References

Carnivorous Plant Database: Nepenthes × pangulubauensis

Carnivorous plants of Asia
pangulubauensis
Nomina nuda